The Tremec TR-6060 six-speed manual transmission features six forward speeds and one reverse speed. It is derived from the Tremec T-56 6-speed manual transmission. As usual, the forward helical cut gears are synchronized. However, the reverse gear operates through a fully synchronized constant-mesh system. The TR-6060 contains removable wear pads on the shift forks, and uses aluminum alloys for the main case, extension housing, and clutch housing.

Changes from T56-six speed

The FG Falcon launch documentation describes the new gearbox: "The new synchroniser package features triple synchromesh on first and second gears, and double synchromesh on all other gears, including reverse, which has significantly reduced gear shift efforts and shift travel.

The reduced shift travel provided by the synchroniser package has also allowed increased space for the use of larger gears, which are stronger to deliver improved torque capacity and gearbox durability.  A new single-piece counter shaft also contributes to the greater torque capacity and durability enhancements.

Other features of the new TR-6060 transmission include:
Reduced friction in the shifter system courtesy of a new cam and anti-friction plunger to control the side load shift detents.
Forward and rearward shift detent grooves are broached on the front of the main-shaft with a spring-loaded anti-friction roller, for more precise control of shift detents and positive shift feel.
Anti-friction ball struts, sintered hubs and fine-pitch splines on all synchronisers for reduced friction between components - delivering improved shift feel and reduced shift efforts.
Wider, two piece gears with machined clutch teeth for more precise gear engagement and reduced potential for gear block-outs."

Lubrication

General Motors uses Texaco ATF Type III 1863 fluid and is certified "fill-for-life," requiring no fluid changes.
Ford US lists a fill specification of 3.65 quarts of Mercon-V automatic transmission fluid. FCA Applications use Mopar ATF +4 Automatic Transmission Fluid.

Applications

2007 Ford Mustang Shelby GT500
2008–2013 Chevrolet Corvette
2008-2017 Dodge Viper 
2008–2016 Ford Falcon
2008–2017 Holden Special Vehicles Range
2009–present Dodge Challenger
2009 Pontiac G8 GXP
2009–2015 Cadillac CTS-V
2010-2014 Ford Shelby GT500
2010–present Chevrolet Camaro SS
2012–present Chevrolet Camaro ZL1
2013–2017 Gen-F HSV
2013-2018 Cadillac ATS 2.0L Performance
2015–2017 Chevrolet SS
2016–2019 Cadillac ATS-V
2021–present Cadillac CT4-V Blackwing
2021–present Cadillac CT5-V Blackwing

Selected gear ratios

References

6060
General Motors transmissions